The following is a list of notable deaths in May 2004.

Entries for each day are listed alphabetically by surname. A typical entry lists information in the following sequence:
 Name, age, country of citizenship at birth, subsequent country of citizenship (if applicable), reason for notability, cause of death (if known), and reference.

May 2004

1
Ram Prakash Gupta, 80, Indian politician.
Francis James Harrison, 91, American Roman Catholic prelate, Bishop of Syracuse (1977–1987).
Felix Haug, 52, Swiss pop musician (Double).
Wong Ker-lee, 93, Fujianese Hong Kong businessman and politician.
Larkin Kerwin, 79, Canadian physicist.
Lojze Kovačič, 75, Slovene writer.
Jean-Jacques Laffont, 57, French economist specializing in public economics and information economics, cancer.
John Howland Rowe, 85, American archaeologist and anthropologist.

2
Moe Burtschy, 82, American baseball player, former Major League Baseball pitcher for the Philadelphia & Kansas City Athletics.
Nelson Gidding, 84, American screenwriter, congestive heart failure.
Paul Guimard, 83, French writer.
Tony Poeta, 71, Canadian professional ice hockey player (Chicago Black Hawks).

3
Anthony Ainley, 71, British actor (Doctor Who).
Andrew Cavendish, 11th Duke of Devonshire, 84, British aristocrat and politician.
Darrell Johnson, 75, American MLB catcher and manager.
Volus Jones, 90, American animator.
Lygia Pape, 77, Brazilian visual artist, sculptor, and filmmaker.

4
Clement Dodd, 72, Jamaican reggae pioneer.
Tage Frid, 88, Danish woodworker, complications of Alzheimer's disease.
Hugh Gillin, 78, American actor (Back to the Future Part III).
David Reimer, 39, Canadian notable gender-reassignment victim, suicide.
Erik Smith, 73, German-born British music producer.

5
Teddy Alfarero, 41, Filipino basketball player, complications from a liver ailment.
John Cornforth, 66, English architectural historian.
Duane Francies, 82, American military aviator.
José Maceda, 87, Filipino composer and ethnomusicologist.
Ritsuko Okazaki, 44, Japanese singer-songwriter and author.

6
Virginia Capers, 78, American actress (Raisin, Lady Sings the Blues, Ferris Bueller's Day Off), Tony winner (1974).
Kjell Hallbing, (aka Louis Masterson), 69, Norwegian Western author.
Sir John Hill, 90, British police officer.
Barney Kessel, 80, American jazz guitarist and studio musician.
James A. Krumhansl, 84, American physicist.
Joe Lafata, 82, American baseball player (New York Giants).
Charlotte Thiele, 85, German actress.
Daniel Thompson, 69, American poet.

7
Nick Berg, 26, American businessman and hostage killed in Iraq.
Winifred Cavenagh, 95, British criminologist.
Douglas John Foskett, 85, British librarian.
Oliver David Jackson, 84, Australian army officer.
Waldemar Milewicz, 48, Polish journalist, and Mounyra Beouamrane, killed in Iraq.

8
Lewis Caine, 39, Australian organised crime figure, murdered during the Melbourne gangland killings.
Quentin Hughes, 84, British architect and army officer.
Sir John Peel, 91, British politician, MP for Leicester South East (1957–1974).
Ronnie Robinson, 53, American basketball player.
Valentin Yezhov, 83, Soviet and Russian screenwriter and playwright.

9
Tommy Farrell, 82, American film and television actor.
Brenda Fassie, 39, South African singer.
Akhmad Kadyrov, 52, Chechen politician, President of Chechnya.
Alan King, 76, American comedian and actor.
Wayne McLeland, 79, American baseball player (Detroit Tigers).
Olive Osmond, 79, American Osmond singing family matriarch, mother of entertainers Marie Osmond and the various Osmond Brothers.
Walter H. Stockmayer, 90, American chemist and university teacher, and a pioneer in polymer science.
Percy M. Young, 91, British musicologist.

10
Anthony Babington, 84, Anglo-Irish author, judge and Army officer.
Phil Gersh, 92, American talent and literary agent.
Eric Kierans, 90, Canadian economist and politician.
Gunnar Ibsen Sørensen, 90, Danish Olympic rower (men's coxed four rowing at the 1936 Summer Olympics).
Dennis Wilshaw, 78, English international footballer, heart attack.

11
Mick Doyle, 63, Irish rugby union player and coach.
Danny McLennan, 79, Scottish football player and coach.
Hans Senger, 78, Austrian Olympic alpine skier (men's giant slalom and men's slalom at the 1952 Winter Olympics).
John Whitehead, 55, American R&B artist, shot dead.

12
Judith Cook, 70, British theatre historian, campaigner and novelist.
Syd Hoff, 91, American children's book author, cartoonist.
John LaPorta, 84, American jazz clarinetist, composer and educator.
Dave Piontek, 69, American professional basketball player (Rochester / Cincinnati Royals, St. Louis Hawks, Chicago Packers).
John Robson, 54, English footballer.
Alexander Skutch, 99, American naturalist and writer, regarded as one of the world's greatest ornithologists.

13
Vicente Doria Catan Jr, 56, Filipino comic book artist.
Joey Curtis, 79, American professional boxer, boxing referee and business owner.
Floyd Kalber, 79, American broadcast journalist.
Brian McNaughton, 68, American horror and fantasy writer.
Muhammad Nawaz, 79, Pakistani Olympic javelin thrower (men's javelin throw at the 1956 and 1960 Summer Olympics).

14
Charlotte Benkner, 114, American supercentenarian, oldest recognized person in United States.
Rip Coleman, 72, American baseball player (New York Yankees, Kansas City Athletics, Baltimore Orioles).
Jesus Gil, 71, Spanish businessman and politician, controversial owner of Atlético Madrid football club.
Bill Hoffman, 86, American baseball player (Philadelphia Phillies).
Jack Holland (writer), 56, Irish journalist, novelist, and poet, cancer.
Anna Lee, 91, British-born American actress, best known for playing Lila Quartermaine on the soap opera General Hospital.
Shaun Sutton, 84, British television executive.

15
Jack Bradbury, 89, American animator (Pinocchio, Bambi, Fantasia) and comic book artist.
Gill Fox, 88, American political cartoonist, comic book artist, and animator.
William H. Hinton, 85, American writer, farmer and Marxist, author of Fanshen: A Documentary of Revolution in a Chinese Village.
Colonel Robert Morgan, 85, American US Air Force pilot, former pilot of the Memphis Belle.
Clint Warwick, 63, British bass guitarist (The Moody Blues).

16
Moya Cole, 85, Northern Irish physician and hospice founder.
Peter Hill-Norton, Baron Hill-Norton, 89, British Royal Navy Admiral of the Fleet.
Kamala Markandaya, 80, Indian novelist and journalist.
Marika Rökk, 90, Egyptian-born German actress.
Billy Stone, 78, American professional football player (Bradley University, Baltimore Colts, Chicago Bears).
June Taylor, 86, American television dancer and choreographer.

17
Gunnar Graps, 57, Estonian rock singer and percussionist.
Robert Lewin, 85, Polish art dealer and philanthropist.
Buster Narum, 63, American baseball player, former Major League Baseball pitcher for the Orioles and Senators.
Jørgen Nash, 84, Danish poet, performance artist.
Tony Randall, 84, American actor (Pillow Talk, The Odd Couple, Inherit the Wind), Emmy winner (1975), pneumonia.
James Armstrong Richardson, 82, Canadian member of House of Commons, Minister of Supply and Services, Minister of National Defence.
Ezzedine Salim, 60–61, Iraqi politician, president of the Iraqi Governing Council.

18
Arnold O. Beckman, 104, American inventor, industrialist and philanthropist.
Heinrich Isser, 76, Austrian Olympic bobsledder.
Elvin Jones, 76, American jazz drummer, John Coltrane Quartet of the 1960s.
Lü Fuyuan, 59, Chinese politician, Minister of Commerce of China, liver cancer.
Kelsey Patterson, 50, American convicted murderer, execution by lethal injection.
David Tabor, 81, British army general.
Hyacinthe Thiandoum, 83, Senegalese Roman Catholic Cardinal, Archbishop of Dakar.

19
Mary Dresselhuys, 97, Dutch actress.
Jack Eckerd, 91, American businessman, former owner of the Eckerd drugstore chain.
Melvin J. Lasky, 84,  American journalist, intellectual and anti-communist.
Arnold Moore, 90, American blues artist.
E.K. Nayanar, 87, Indian politician, three-time Chief Minister of Kerala, India.

20
Dennis Coslett, 64, Welsh political activist.
Archibald Cox, 92, American lawyer and law professor.
Stanisław Gronkowski, 82, Polish actor.(Polish)
Len Murray, Lord Murray of Epping Forest, 81, British trade union leader.

21
Jean-Pierre Blanc, 62, French film director and screenwriter.
Andrew Green, 76, British author and ghost hunter.
Rod Hall, 53, British literary agent, murdered.
Toshikazu Kase, 101, Japanese civil servant and diplomat.
Ali Sahli, 80, Libyan politician.
Danylo Shumuk, 89, Ukrainian political activist.
Michael Swindells, 44, British police officer, stabbed.
Gene Wood, 78, American television personality, announcer of Family Feud and other US game shows, lung cancer.

22
Richard Biggs, 44, American actor (Babylon 5, Days of Our Lives, Strong Medicine), aortic dissection.
Samuel Curtis Johnson, 76, American businessman, fourth generation president of SC Johnson company.
Wayne Kimber, 55, New Zealand politician.
Mikhail Voronin, 59, Russian gymnast, double Olympic champion.

23
Sally Gilmour, 82, British ballet dancer.
Adele Leigh, 75, English operatic soprano, heart attack.
Ramon Margalef, 85, Spanish biologist and ecologist.
Trudy Marshall, 84, American actress.
Frank Kobina Parkes, 72, Ghanaian journalist, broadcaster and poet.
Harry Preston, 72, Canadian Olympic field hockey player (Field hockey at the 1964 Summer Olympics).

24
Daphne Blundell, 87, British naval officer.
Henry Ries, 86, American photographer, known for his photos of the 1948 Berlin Air Lift.
Edward Wagenknecht, 104, American literary critic and teacher.
Lee Won-woo, 45, South Korean basketball player.

25
Glenn Cunningham, 60, American politician, mayor of Jersey City, New Jersey.
David Dellinger, 88, American antiwar activist, member of Chicago Eight.
Nicholas Luard, 66, British writer and politician.
Robert P. Sharp, 92, American geomorphologist and expert on the geology of Earth and Mars.
Roger W. Straus, Jr., 87, American publisher (Farrar, Straus and Giroux).

26
Donald Hamish Cameron of Lochiel, 93, Scottish landowner and a financier.
Rewata Dhamma, 74, Burmese Theravada Buddhist monk and scholar.
Gatjil Djerrkura, 54, Australian indigenous leader.

27
Umberto Agnelli, 69, Italian industrialist, head of Fiat.
Patience Cleveland, 73, American actress (Donnie Darko, Psycho III, General Hospital).
Ladislav Hecht, 94, Czechoslovak tennis player.
Jack Losch, 69, American member of 1st Little League World Series championship team.
Jim Marshall, 63, British Labour MP.
Mikhail Postnikov, 76, Soviet mathematician, known for his work in algebraic and differential topology.

28
Michael Alison, 77, British Privy Council member and former minister and MP.
Gerald Anthony, 52, American actor, best known for playing Marco Dane on the TV show One Life to Live.
Josie Carey, 73, American lyricist, host of the Pittsburgh children's show "Children's Corner".
Irene Manning, 91, American actress and singer (Yankee Doodle Dandy).
James Neil Tucker, 47, American convicted murderer.

29
Archibald Cox, 92, American lawyer, Watergate special prosecutor.
Sam Dash, 79, American lawyer, chief counsel to the House Judiciary Committee during the Watergate scandal.
Magne Havnå, 40, Norwegian former professional boxer, in boating accident.
Frank Newman, 77, American education reformer and administrator (Education Commission of the States).
Jack Rosenthal, 72, British television dramatist.
Sir Gordon Wolstenholme, 91, British physician.

30
Raymond M. Clausen, Jr., 56, American marine, Medal of Honour recipient.
Bobbie Irvine, 71, British ballroom dancer.
Rafał Kurmański, 21, Polish speedway rider, suicide.
Ed Stanczak, 82, American professional basketball player (Anderson Packers, Boston Celtics).

31
Gunnar Hansen, 87, Norwegian Olympic boxer.
Alberta Martin, 97, American notable widow, last known widow of a Confederate soldier.
Stanislav Otáhal, 90, Czechoslovakian Olympic middle-distance runner (men's 800 metres at the 1936 Summer Olympics).
Artimus Parker, 52, American professional football player (Philadelphia Eagles, New York Jets).
Robert Quine, 61, American punk rock guitarist.

References

2004-05
 05